Basic Korean Dictionary is an online learner's dictionary of the Korean language, launched on 5 October 2016 by the National Institute of Korean Language. It consists of one monolingual and ten bilingual dictionaries that provide meanings of Korean words and expressions in Korean, English, Arabic, French, Indonesian, Japanese, Mongolian, Russian, Spanish, Thai, and Vietnamese.

Multilingual support 
 Korean: Basic Korean dictionary
 Korean–English: Korean–English Learners' Dictionary
 Korean–Arabic: 
 Korean–French: 
 Korean–Indonesian: 
 Korean–Japanese: 
 Korean–Mongolian: 
 Korean–Russian: 
 Korean–Spanish: 
 Korean–Thai: 
 Korean–Vietnamese:

See also 
 Standard Korean Language Dictionary

References

External links 
 

Korean dictionaries
Online dictionaries